Peoples Trust Company, operating as Peoples Group, is a Canadian financial services company based in Vancouver, British Columbia. Peoples Group operates as a trust company and also maintains a chartered bank subsidiary, Peoples Bank of Canada. It is a subsidiary of the Alberta-based holding company Triple Five Group and maintains offices in Vancouver, Calgary, and Toronto.

History

When Peoples Trust opened in 1985, it focused on the origination of residential and multi-family mortgage products, and the provision of short- and long-term guaranteed investment products. It now includes a specialty in care facility and other commercial mortgages, corporate & specialized lending, as well as a line of secured and prepaid credit card products.

Services
Services provided by Peoples Trust:
 Mortgage origination (Multi-Family, Commercial, Construction, and Residential)
 Mortgage servicing
 Deposit services (GICs, RRSPs, TFSAs, e-Savings)
 Secured credit cards
 Prepaid credit cards
 Corporate & specialized lending

Membership and affiliations
Peoples Group and its subsidiary Peoples Bank of Canada are separately members of the Canada Deposit Insurance Corporation (CDIC).

Class Action Lawsuit
On May 13, 2019, the Ontario Superior Court awarded $16.8 million (CAD) (including $1.5 million in punitive damages) to plaintiffs in a class action lawsuit regarding fees and unused balances the company seized from consumers of its prepaid gift cards between 2012 and 2014. The settlement was approved by a judge in September 2020 and all eligible Ontarians are able to make a claim.  The lawsuit covers activities until 2014 but the company continued to issue cards and collect fees that saw the card face value decrease progressively as Peoples Group continued to deduct monthly 'service' fees.  So a user who bought a $100 card and didn't use it, would eventually see the balance decrease to $0.

Impacted cards as part of the lawsuit included: Vanilla Prepaid Visa or MasterCard, Give and Go Prepaid Visa, House Points, The Ideal Choice/Online Payment Card MasterCard, Shell Non-Reloadable MasterCard.  Along with reloadable prepaid cards under the product names of: Nextwave Titanium+ Prepaid Visa, EPIC Prepaid MasterCard, Evolve Prepaid Visa, HorizonPlus Prepaid MasterCard, PTC Company US Dollar Prepaid MasterCard, Shell Prepaid Reloadable MasterCard and YesCard Prepaid Visa.

References

External links
 
 Peoples Bank website

Financial services companies based in British Columbia
Companies based in Vancouver
Financial services companies established in 1985
1985 establishments in British Columbia